Dziennik Polski is a Polish newspaper. It was established in 1945 as a regional newspaper for Lesser Poland region. The circulation of the paper was 87,000 copies in 2003. Its print and e-edition circulation was 21,133 in August 2014.

References

1945 establishments in Poland
Newspapers established in 1945
Daily newspapers published in Poland
Polish-language newspapers
Mass media in Kraków